Turtle Butte is a summit in Tripp County, South Dakota, in the United States.

Turtle Butte derives its name from a Native American legend in which a warrior sat upon a rock only to realize the rock was in fact a giant turtle.

Turtle Butte Formation is a named geological formation on the western side of the summit.

References

Landforms of Tripp County, South Dakota
Mountains of South Dakota